Goodman or Goodmans may refer to:

Businesses
 Goodman Games, American publisher
 Goodman Global, an American HVAC manufacturer
 Goodman Group, an Australian property company
 Goodmans Industries, a British electronic company
 Goodmans, a Canadian law firm

People and fictional characters
 Goodman (surname), a list of people and fictional characters
 Goodman (given name), a list of people

Places in the United States
 Goodman, Alabama, an unincorporated community
 Goodman, Mississippi, a town
 Goodman, Missouri, a city
 Goodman, Wisconsin, a town
 Goodman (CDP), Wisconsin, an unincorporated community in the town
 Goodman, West Virginia, an unincorporated community

Other uses
 Goodman (title), an obsolete polite term of address, comparable to "Mister"
 Goodman Building (disambiguation)
 Goodman (shopping centre), Hämeenlinna, Finland
 Goodman Theatre, a theater in Chicago, Illinois, United States
Goodman & Gilman's The Pharmacological Basis of Therapeutics, a 1941 textbook of pharmacology

See also
 Goodman House (disambiguation)
 Good Man (disambiguation)
 A Good Man (disambiguation)